Brazilian Naval Aviation (AvN) is the air arm of the Brazilian Navy operating from ships and from shore installations.

History
The Brazilian Naval Aviation branch was organized in August 1916, after creation of the Brazilian naval aviation school and the Brazilian aviation flotilla. Brazilian naval aviators participated in patrol operations during the First World War, incorporating into the 10th Operations Group of the Royal Air Force.

The Brazilian Air Force was founded on January 20, 1941 extinguishing independent Army and Navy aviation at that time and forming a new armed service.

From mid-1942 until the end of the Second World War, the Brazilian Air Force patrolled the Atlantic. On 31 July 1943 it sank the German submarine U-199, which was located on the surface off Rio de Janeiro. Two Brazilian aircraft, a PBY Catalina and a Lockheed Hudson, and an American PBM Mariner attacked the U-boat. The Catalina, named Ärará, was captained by 2º Ten.-Av. (2nd Lt.) Alberto M. Torres, and hit U-199 with depth charges, sinking her.

In 1956 the aircraft carrier Minas Gerais was acquired by the navy commissioning in 1960.  In 1965 helicopters were permitted, after substantial political struggle, to the navy by a presidential decree.

From 1961 to 1999 the Brazilian Air Force flew the S-2 Trackers of the Brazilian aircraft carrier Minas Gerais while the Navy flew the helicopters.  

In 1997, Minas Gerais was loaned an A-4Q airframe by the Argentine Aviación Naval (Naval Aviation) for deck-handling and interface trials.  This was in lead-up to the 1999 acquisition of 20 A-4KU Skyhawks and three TA-4KU trainer aircraft from the Kuwait Air Force for US$70 million.

In 1998 authority to operate carrier based fixed wing aircraft for the Navy was granted by Presidential decree No. 2538.

On September 30, 1999 Lieutenant Alvarenga of the Brazilian Navy was the last student naval aviator to make an arrested landing in the Skyhawk on a United States aircraft carrier. He is also the last US Navy naval aviation school Skyhawk student to earn his wings.  On April 26, 2000, The first AF-1 (A-4KU) flight in Brazil. The aircraft N-1007 was manned by LtCol (USMC) James Edwin Rogers. A month later the same aircraft was being flown for the first time by a Brazilian Navy pilot who was also the first to do a touch-and-go on the Brazilian Navy carrier Minas Gerais.  On 26 May 2000, Brazilian Navy VF-1, Falcoes AF1 Skyhawk N 1007 piloted by Lieutenant Alvarenga took off from São Pedro d'Aldeia Naval Air Base, Brazil.   This was the first solo flight of a VF-1, Falcoes AF1 Skyhawk and the first fixed-wing flight by a Brazilian Naval Aviator since 1965. In January 2001, the first arrested landing and catapult launch from Minas Gerais of an A-4 were executed by CDR Daniel G. Canin, followed two days later by the first Brazilian Navy fixed wing aviator to land on a Brazilian carrier. Prior to that the fixed wing component of the A-11 Minas Gerais aircraft carrier (the S-2 Trackers) were operated by the Brazilian Air Force.

Naval aviation's roles now include  support of the Brazilian aircraft carrier São Paulo, fleet air defense, reconnaissance, transport of marine personnel, and anti-submarine warfare. It is also responsible for airborne operations of the Brazilian Marine Corps.

In June 2013, Brazilian naval aviation personnel provided carrier training support to the Chinese Navy during the second round of flight tests on board the carrier Liaoning.

Since 2001, by Brazilian invitation, pilot qualification tests of the Argentine Navy's Dassault-Breguet Super Étendards and S-2T Turbo Trackers now take place on the Brazilian Navy carrier São Paulo as Argentina now lacks a carrier of their own.  Brazil also trains with and conducts regular exercises with the US Navy.

Structure

The fighting forces of the Brazilian Navy under the Naval Operations Command are divided into an oceangoing component (called the National Squadron or Esquadra in Portuguese) and a territorial component (the 9 Naval Districts or Distritos Navais). This division is also present in the Brazilian Naval Aviation. Its main component is the Naval Air Forces Command (Comando da Força Aeronaval), which forms a part of the Squadron, together with the Submarine Force Command (Comando da Força de Submarinos), the Surface Force Command (Comando da Força de Superfície), the 1st and 2nd Squadron Division Commands (or Task Forces Staffs - Comando da 1ª Divisão da Esquadra, Comando da 2ª Divisão da Esquadra) and diverse supporting organizations.

Additionally there are three general purpose helicopter squadrons based away from the São Pedro da Aldeia naval air base. These squadrons rely on the Aerial Naval Force Command for personnel training and aircraft maintenance, however they are operationally outside of it and are integral to their respective naval districts.

The air units of the Brazilian Navy have their own internal naming convention. However, in light of its US naval aviation origins (as the first pilots and maintenance personnel of the newly re-established naval aviation were sent for training to the US Navy) the squadron abbreviations do not follow their Brazilian names, but rather the typical abbreviations of their US Navy squadron counterparts (VF for the jet attack squadron, HU for the general purpose helicopter squadrons etc.) The only exception is the helicopter training squadron, which rather than HT for Helicopter Training carries the abbreviation HI for Helicópteros de Instrução.

 NAVAL AIR FORCES COMMAND (Comando da Força Aeronaval), based at São Pedro da Aldeia Naval Air Base (Base Aérea Naval de São Pedro da Aldeia (BAeNSPA)), State of Rio de Janeiro. The force is commanded by a Rear Admiral, which in the Brazilian Navy is the lowest of three admiral ranks.
 Squadrons
 1st Interception and Attack Aircraft Squadron "Falcon" (1º Esquadrão de Aviões de Interceptação e Ataque) (VF-1 "Falcão") (est. October 2, 1998), flying AF-1/ AF-1A (twin-seater) (ex-Kuwaiti A/TA-4KU Skyhawks, currently being modernized by EMBRAER to AF-1B/ AF-1C (twin-seater)) multi-role light attack carrier aircraft; Squadron Motto: "In Aere Defensio Maris" (Latin for: "In the air defending the sea")
 (1st Transport and Early Warning Aircraft Squadron (1º Esquadrão de Transporte e Alarme Aéreo Antecipado (VR-1 or VEC-1)) when the S-2 Turbo Tracker AEW and KC-2 Turbo Trader aircraft are delivered Although the carrier is decommissioned, there is no info for the termination of the Turbo Tracker/ Turbo Trader deal and the personnel for the future squadron is in training in the US.), awaiting delivery of KC-2 (C-1A/S-2T) Turbo Trackers
 1st Anti-Submarine Helicopter Squadron "Warrior" (1º Esquadrão de Helicópteros Antissubmarino (HS-1 "Guerreiro") (est. May 28, 1965), flying SH/MH-16 (S-70B Seahawk) medium ASW helicopters, which replaced the SH-3 Sea Kings; Squadron Motto: "Ad astra per aspera" (Latin for: "To the stars through hardships")
 1st Reconnaissance and Attack Helicopter Squadron "Lynx" (1º Esquadrão de Helicópteros de Esclarecimento e Ataque (HA-1 "Lince") (est. January 17, 1979), flying AH-11A (Super Lynx Mk.21A) light ASW helicopters; Squadron Motto: "Invenire Hostem et Delere" (Latin for: "Face the enemy and destroy him")
 1st General Purpose Helicopter Squadron "Eagle" (1º Esquadrão de Helicópteros de Emprego Geral (HU-1 "Águia") (est. April 17, 1962),  flying UH-12 (HB350B/BA) and UH-13 (AS355F2) light utility helicopters; Squadron Motto: "In Omnia Paratus" (Latin for: "Ready for anything")
 2nd General Purpose Helicopter Squadron "Pegasus" (2º Esquadrão de Helicópteros de Emprego Geral (HU-2 "Pégaso") (est. February 25, 1988), flying UH-14 (AS332F1, AS532M1) and UH-15/A/B (EC725BR-B/BR-M) medium utility helicopters; Squadron Motto: "Para que outros possam viver" (Portuguese for: "That others may live")
 1st Training Helicopter Squadron "White Crane" (1º Esquadrão de Helicópteros de Instrução (HI-1 "Garça") (est. June 27, 1962), flying IH-6B (Bell 206B-3) light training helicopters; Squadron Motto: "Nós ensinamos aos homens o que Deus legou apenas aos pássaros" (Portuguese for: "We instill into men God's gift to the birds")
 1st Remotely-Piloted Aircraft Squadron "Harpy Eagle" (1º Esquadrão de Aeronaves Remotamente Pilotadas (QE-1 "Harpia") (est. July 5, 2022), flying Boeing Insitu ScanEagle UAVs); Squadron Motto: "Ex oculto investigare et agnoscere" (Latin for: "To investigate and identify from hiding")
 Support units
 Naval Air Base São Pedro da Aldeia (Base Aérea Naval de São Pedro da Aldeia (BAeNSPA))
 Naval Aviation Training and Education Center (Centro de Instrução e Adestramento Aeronaval (CIAAN))
 Naval Quartermaster Center São Pedro da Aldeia (Centro de Intendência da Marinha em São Pedro da Aldeia (CeIMSPA))
 Naval Policlinic of São Pedro da Aldeia (Policlínica Naval de São Pedro da Aldeia (PNSPA))
 Naval District Aviation Squadrons (Esquadrões Distritais)
 4th Naval District (4.° Distrito Naval), based in Belém, Pará
1st Northern General Purpose Helicopter Squadron (1º Esquadrão de Helicópteros de Emprego Geral do Norte (HU-41 "") (est. May 22, 2019), based at Belém Air Base (the military section of Belém/Val-de-Cans International Airport), co-located with the Air Force's 9th Air Wing (Ala 9). The squadron flies 3 UH-15 Super Cougar (the Brazilian Navy variant of the H225M) in aerial support of the ships of the Northern Naval Patrol Groupment (Grupamento de Patrulha Naval do Norte), the 2nd Riverine Operations Battalion of the Brazilian Marines (2º Batalhão de Operações Ribeirinhas) and search and rescue in support of the Belem Port Authoruty (Capitania dos Portos do Belém). The squadron is also certified to operate from ships (Qualificação e Requalificação de Pouso a Bordo (QRPB)).
(NI-DAE-Belém), o qual deverá, gradativamente, assumir a responsabilidade pela estrutura física, organizacional e orçamentária do EsqdHU-41
5th Naval District (5.° Distrito Naval), based in Rio Grande, Rio Grande do Sul
 1st Southern General Purpose Helicopter Squadron "Albatross" (1º Esquadrão de Helicópteros de Emprego Geral do Sul (HU-51 "Albatroz") (est. June 25, 1998), based at Ilha do Terrapleno de Leste/ Rio Grande,  flying UH-12 (HB350B/BA) light utility helicopters in support of border guard operations in the extreme south. The squadron is also certified to operate from ships (QRPB). Squadron Motto: ""Albatroz, as asas da Marinha no Sul"" (Portuguese for: "Albatross, the naval aces in the South")
 6th Naval District (6.° Distrito Naval), based in Ladário, Mato Grosso do Sul
 1st Western General Purpose Helicopter Squadron "Hawk" (1º Esquadrão de Helicópteros de Emprego Geral do Oeste (HU-61 "Gavião") (est. May 16, 1995), based at Ladário Riverine Base, flying UH-12 (HB350B/BA), IH-6B (Bell 206 B-3) light utility helicopters, providing aerial support in the Rio Paraguay and Paraná river basins on the borders with Paraguay and Bolivia to the ships of the Mato Grosso Flotilla Command (Comando da Flotilha de Mato Grosso), the marines of the 3rd Riverine Operations Battalion (3º Batalhão de Operações Ribeirinhas) and search and rescue in support of the Pantanal Riverine Port Captaincy (Capitania Fluvial do Pantanal). The squadron is also certified to operate from ships (QRPB). Squadron Motto: "Gavião, as asas da Marinha no Pantanal" (Portuguese for: "Hawk, the naval aces in the Pantanal")
 9th Naval District (9.º Distrito Naval), based in Manaus, Amazonas
 1st Northwestern General Purpose Helicopter Squadron "Toucan" (1.º Esquadrão de Helicópteros de Emprego Geral do Nordoeste (HU-91 "Tucano") (est. April 14, 1994), based at Ponta Pelada/ Manaus, flying UH-12 (HB350B/BA) light utility helicopters, providing aerial support to the ships of the Amazonian Flotilla Command (Comando da Flotilha do Amazonas), the marines of the 1st Riverine Operations Battalion (1º Batalhão de Operações Ribeirinhas) and search and rescue operations in the Amazonia region in support of the riverine port authorities. The squadron is also certified to operate from ships (QRPB). Squadron Motto: "Sobre rio, selva e mar ... Tucano!" (Portuguese for: "Over the river, the savanna and the sea... Toucan!")

Equipment

Aircraft

As of 2014, the Brazilian Naval Aviation operates around 70 aircraft.

Weapons
 Air-to-air missile AIM-9H Sidewinder. A-4
 Air-to-air missile MAA-1B. A-4
 Air-to-surface missile Sea Skua. Super Lynx
 Anti-tank guided missile Spike. Super Lynx
 Anti-ship missile Penguin. S-70B
 Anti-ship missile Exocet. SH-3, EC-725 Cougar
 Lightweight torpedo Mark 46 torpedo. Super Lynx, SH-3, S-70B
 Lightweight torpedo Mark 54 Lightweight Torpedo . H225M
 Bomb Mark 82 bomb. A-4
 Bomb Mark 83 bomb. A-4

See also
 Brazilian Navy
 Brazilian Marine Corps
 Brazilian Air Force
 Military of Brazil

References

Bibliography
 
 Scheina, Robert L., Latin America's Wars: The Age of the Caudillo, 1791–1899, Brassey's, 2003

External links

 Command of the Aeronaval Forces Official website
 Scramble: Brazilian Naval Air Arms
 Wings over the seas: the Brazilian Naval Aviation
 Aviação Naval Brasil

Commands of the Brazilian Armed Forces
 
Naval aviation services